The Wind is Watching is an American dystopian film directed by Conrad Faraj and written by Candyce Cook. Production began in mid-2012, with filming taking place in 28 locations across Northeast Ohio.

Premise
In a rural dystopia, a nuclear contamination in the Pacific Ocean has provoked a second civil war. A young farm girl named Cara Gardner (Nicole Ann Hicks) must embark on a journey through war-torn America to rescue her only remaining family.

Cast

 Nicole Ann Hicks as Cara Gardner
 Rick Montgomery Jr. as General Joseph Kellerman
 Logan Roberts as Jamie Gardner
 Aleksandar Zivkovic as Finn
 Nicole Karis as Afton
 Douglas Slygh as Barry Kellerman
 Mary Faktor as Rose
 Jonathan Yurco as Calvin
 Brianna Burke as Nadia
 Bailey Weaver as Ashley
 John Williamson as Quentin

Production
According to the film's director, 70% of the film was shot in Shelby, Ohio and Mansfield, Ohio, with some scenes having been shot at the Ohio State Reformatory.

External links

Notes

American dystopian films
American science fiction films
Films shot in Ohio